The Revolutionary Socialist Party was a political party in Zambia led by Samson Banda. The party issued its draft programme in 1991. The party was part of an alliance led by UNIP.

RSP was one of several leftwing groups that sprung up in Zambia during the 1990s. It suffered from lack of financial resources and organisational capacity. The party was de-registered in March 1998.

References

Defunct political parties in Zambia
Socialist parties in Africa
Political parties established in 1991
Political parties disestablished in 1998
1991 establishments in Zambia
1998 disestablishments in Zambia